Nell Hopman and Harry Hopman successfully defended their title by defeating Dot Stevenson and Don Turnbull 3–6, 6–3, 6–2, to win the mixed doubles tennis title at the 1937 Australian Championships.

Seeds

  Nell Hopman /  Harry Hopman (champions)
  Dot Stevenson /  Don Turnbull (final)
  Nancye Wynne /  Gar Moon (semifinals)
  Joan Hartigan /  Arthur Huxley (quarterfinals)

Draw

Draw

References

External links
  Source for seedings and the draw

1937 in Australian tennis
Mixed Doubles